Akköse is a village in the Dernekpazarı district of Trabzon Province, Turkey, close to the town of Trabzon. It is situated in between high mountains, in a lush and largely untouched environment.
Districts of Zeno ( akkose) village:Liso, Lisako, Aksilisa, Agorgor, Gaylorashi, Siseno

Villages in Trabzon Province